Rzymy-Las  is a village in the administrative district of Gmina Łuków, within Łuków County, Lublin Voivodeship, in eastern Poland.

The village has a population of 100.

References

Rzymy-Las